Auchterless (meaning the "Upper Part of Less") is a village in Aberdeenshire, Scotland; grid reference NJ 713 416, postcode AB53 8BG.  The nearest large settlement is Turriff. It is traditionally known as "Kirkton of Auchterless".

History
The history of Auchterless dates back to prehistoric times, with prehistoric remains including stone circles, and the remains of earthen huts.

Ruined St Drostan's Church retains a birdcage bellcote, a chamfered arch window and bell dated 1644.

Towie-Barclay farm incorporates Tolly Castle, once a Barclay stronghold. It is two miles north east of Auchterless. It was built in the 14th century, but the bulk of the remains are from the 16th century.

Auchterless (New Parish) Church was built in 1879 by W & J Smith. Parts of the previous church are built into the tower wall. The Duff of Hamilton mausoleum, 1877, has pedimented gables and a marble coat-of-arms.

Auchterless station served the settlement and was opened in 1857 by the Banff Macduff & Turriff Junction Railway, later part of the Great North of Scotland Railway, then the LNER and finally British Railways, on the branchline from Inveramsay to Macduff, the station closed to passengers in 1951 and the line closed to goods in 1966. The station lay to the north-east, the main building remaining as a private housing as do the railway cottages.

References

Specific

General
 AA Touring Guide to Scotland (1978)

Bibliography

Villages in Aberdeenshire